Louisa John-Krol is a Melbourne-based Australian artist of the romantic folk/pop genre - described as 'romantic pop-ethereal faerie' music by the artist herself and others.  She has released six albums to date, originally on the German label, Hyperium Records, but in more recent years with the French label Prikosnovénie aka The Fairy World Label. She has also been involved in a number of collaborative projects with other artists, including two film soundtracks.  Louisa is often compared to Loreena McKennitt and Kate Bush.

Discography

Until 2008 her solo albums have all started with A:
 Argo (1996)
 Alexandria (2000)
 Ariel (2002)
 Alabaster (2003)
 Apple Pentacle (2005)
 Alexandria (re-release 2007)
 Djinn (2008)

Her collaborative work has included:
 Love Sessions (2002) with Daemonia Nymphe, Gor, & Lys
 Artemis Asphodel (2004) with Saaroth
 Spyros Giasafakis with Christian Wolz (of Daemonia Nymphe) (2004)
 Ghost Fish (2005) with Daemonia Nymphe and Nikodemos Triaridis
 Stella Maris (2005) with Alquimia & Kerstin Blodig
 Wintersilence with Mathias Grassow (2004)
 I Hear the Water Dreaming (2005) with Oöphoi & Mark Krol
 Destroying the World to Save It (2005) with Ikon

John-Krol's work has also been included in over a dozen compilations. All of her lyrics stem from fairy tales and literature generally. She is known to have worked as a story teller for many years, and is believed to currently also teach music and literature.

Louisa performed in Mons (Belgium) at the Trolls and Legendes concert.

References

External links 

Louisa John-Krol homepage
MySpace-page
Louisa's current label Prikosnovénie

Australian musicians
Living people
Prikosnovénie artists
Year of birth missing (living people)